The distinctive literary styles and themes of Robert E. Howard rely on a combination of many factors.  In his fiction, he used devices borrowed from classical and traditional works, as well as formal rhetoric.  In his poetry, he used rhythm, stress, and intonation to achieve a sense of motion.  Some of his fiction has been described as prose poetry.  His works can be distinguished by his use of violence and hate as positive forces in his universe, which can be seen as a part of the American Myth.  In keeping with the era in which he worked, a grim and hardboiled theme pervades. The continuing cycle of civilisation and barbarism is highlighted in several works.  Although he died before it was formally defined, an existentialism subtext runs through his writing.  He was an aesthete and had affinity for romanticism and neo-romanticism, although in this he was out of step with his era.

Styles

Language and word use

Howard used an economy of words to sketch out scenes in his stories; his ability to do so has been attributed to his skill with, and experience of, both tall tales and poetry. Howard's stories have a sense of authenticity and a natural deft use of language due to his investment in the narrative.  The trait is considered the mark of a master in oral storytelling.  Some of his stories, such as "The Mirrors of Tuzun Thune", have been described as prose poems in their vigorous and rhythmic writing. Howard's tall tale background is the source of the rhythm, drive and authenticity of his work.

Howard's writing frequently uses hypermodification, where most nouns and most verbs are modified.  Sometimes a single word can have multiple modifiers. For example, in the line "the saw-edged crescent blade of the Yuetshi", the noun "blade" is modified with both "crescent" and "saw-edged".  Howard would use both compound modification (i.e. A and B) or serial modification (i.e. A, B, C).  In addition to liberal use of adjectives and adverbs, he would use nominal compounds and compound verbs.  Coffman writes that this is something that "in most writers, is a flaw, but which Robert E. Howard gets away with beautifully."

Howard occasionally included descriptive details as lists; the rapid succession adding to the pace of the prose.  For example, "Flat, flaring nostrils, retreating chin, fangs, no forehead whatever, great, immensely long arms dangling from sloping, incredible shoulders".

His writing attempts to match the reading pace with the pace of the story, so his language is as packed as the action being depicted. In addition to the action packing of the plot (compound, modified and multi-modified verbs), descriptive passages are similarly packed with detail.   Stephen King wrote that "[i]n his best work, Howard's writing seems so highly charged with energy that it nearly gives off sparks. Stories such as "The People of the Black Circle" glow with the fierce and eldritch light of his frenzied intensity."

Frequently a description is echoed or repeated, with subtle differences, throughout one of Howard's works, building a vivid descriptive resonance.  For example, Xapur in the Conan story "The Devil in Iron" is variously described with the phrases "castellated", "some ancient ruins upon it", "rises sheer out of the sea", and "castle-like cliffs".

Traditional devices 
Howard incorporated elements of existing narrative traditions in his writing.  As well as frequent use of standard similes, he used Homeric similes, or elaborate and detailed comparisons.  For example: "As a panther strikes down a bull moose at bay, so he plunged under the bludgeoning arms and drove the crescent blade to the hilt under the spot where a human's heart would be."  Another element borrowed from the classical tradition is the use of epithets; the most obvious of these is "The Cimmerian" when referring to his most famous character, Conan.

He often made use of flyting, boastful and taunting dialogue preparatory to a physical fight; a device probably borrowed from Shakespeare.  For example: "'Dog!' he taunted. 'You can't hit me! I was not born to die on Hyrkanian steel! Try again, pig of Turan!'"  Howard's best short stories have been compared to Elizabethan plays and poems, in the sense of the strength of the narrative, the striking imagery and the sense of a larger context than man's own immediate environment. Fritz Leiber compares, "without over-praise", Howard's "The People of the Black Circle" to the plays of Christopher Marlowe and John Webster.

Rhetorical devices 
Howard had a grounding in rhetorical techniques, either through self-study or formal schooling, that he used in his writing.

A favourite device was the tricolon, a sentence with three clearly defined parts.  This was often used in combination with asyndeton and polysyndeton, in which conjunctions are either removed entirely or repeated in close succession.  For example, the line "fold after slimy fold knotting about him, twisting, crushing, killing him," is, in the highlighted text, an asyndetic tricolon.  While the following line, "then it fell, shearing through the scales, and flesh, and vertebrae," is a polysyndetic tricolon.

The devices alliteration, assonance and consonance are also common in Howard's works.  This refers to the repetition of sounds in a series of words.

Story structure 
Howard's stories usually have action openings rather than exposition.  They often include some characterisation, sometimes of secondary characters.

Howard's plots are frequently constructed from interlaced plot strands, shifting between the locations and perspectives of different groups and characters.

Meter 
The meter used by Howard in his poetry creates a sense of motion.  His most commonly used foot is the Trochee, a stressed syllable followed by an unstressed syllable that gives a sense of increased speed but can also evoke sadness.  Less used but still favoured by Howard were the Anapaest, two unstressed syllables followed by a stressed syllable, and its inverse the Dactyl.  These feet echo galloping hooves, rolling oceans and thundering winds.  His lines are usually end-stopped rather than run-on, enjambments which further add to the sense of dynamism.

Howard himself was critical of his own poetry and understanding of prosody, writing in a 1931 letter to H. P. Lovecraft: "I know nothing of the mechanics of poetry—I couldn't tell you if a line was anapestic or trochaic to save my neck. I write the stuff by ear, so to speak, and my musical ear is very full of flaws."  Nevertheless, the rhythm, stress, and intonation are present in his works, regardless of his knowledge of the correct nomenclature.

Hate and violence 

In the introduction to Skull-Face and Others (1945) editor August Derleth wrote "In the tales concerning Solomon Kane, Bran Mak Morn, King Kull, and Conan, there is quite possibly more blood-letting and more lusty carnage than in any other group of stories which appeared in pulp magazines in America during the 1930s.  There have come to Arkham House frequent requests for a collection of all the Conan stories; such a collection would almost have to be printed on blood-coloured paper."

Richard Slotkin wrote about the American national myth in his books Regeneration Through Violence (1973), The Fatal Environment (1985) and Gunfighter Nation (1992).  This myth includes the tenet that the violence involved in taming the nation was not only good but a renewing, regenerative act.

Many of the books in Howard's collection were about the subject of the American frontier and he wrote, in a 1933 letter to Derleth, that for him, "frontier days were yesterday." Even Howard's non-Western stories nevertheless draw heavily on the traditions and style of Western fiction.
Sam Lundwall wrote in Science Fiction: What It's All About (1971) that Howard's fiction was "a kind of Wild West in the never-never lands of unbridled fantasy."

Howard's work often features "dark anthropomorphism", the attributing of not only sentience but malevolence to non-humans and inanimate objects.  Any obstacle for the protagonists is not just an impediment but an enemy that hates and must be hated in return.

As a person, Howard considered violence as not only one of the greatest thrills in life but something that gave meaning to life, by struggling to survive and pitting himself against another.
In a 1932 letter to H. P. Lovecraft, Howard described a boxing match that was the greatest moment of his life:

Grimness and realism 
The tone of Howard's works, especially in the Conan stories, is hardboiled, dark and realistic.  This is contrasted with the fantastic elements contained within the stories.  Howard did for fantasy fiction what Dashiell Hammett did for crime fiction.  Both were writing in the same era, when the United States and the world were in upheaval; both were writing for the readers of pulp magazines; both Americanized their respective genres and brought them up to date.

Burlesque humor 
Howard's sense of humor is shown most vividly in the Sailor Steve Costigan and Breckenridge Elkins stories.  These stories of burlesque and slapstick lampooned his own perceived character and flaws: impulsiveness, gullibility, fondness of food and drink, loyalty and politeness.

Themes

Civilization and barbarism 

Direct experience of the oil booms in early twentieth century Texas tainted Howard's view of civilization.  The benefits of progress came with lawlessness and corruption.  One of the most common themes in Howard's writing is based on his view of history, a repeating pattern of civilizations reaching their peak, becoming decadent, decaying and then being conquered by another people.  Many of his works are set in the period of decay or among the ruins the dead civilization leaves behind.  Despite this, Howard was in favour of civilisation; he simply believed it was too fragile to survive for long.

Individualism 

The Kull stories in particular contain a constant theme of the confining nature of laws and customs.  In "Sword Woman", the first of the Dark Agnes stories, Howard "was writing about rebellion and about throwing out the rules of society to make an ideal life for oneself."  Agnes rebels against the social order of the day and refuses to be kept in her place.
Biographer Mark Finn describes the protofeminist Dark Agnes stories as "practically autobiographical" and believes that the use of the first-person perspective was intentional.

Howard felt strongly about individual freedom. School had been frustrating for Howard, who was much more literate than his peers and not challenged by the schoolwork on offer.  He felt trapped by the rules of the classroom.

In a 1932 letter to H. P. Lovecraft, Howard wrote:

In his semi-autobiographical novel Post Oaks & Sand Roughs, Howard's proxy character, Steve Costigan displays a similar aversion to authority:

Existentialism 
Though Howard died in 1936, before existentialism was defined, it was popularised in the United States by Jean-Paul Sartre's Being and Nothingness (1943), his philosophy, as shown through his works, is a close parallel.

Howard's most famous character, Conan, is an existentialist character who defines his own purpose and shapes his own destiny.  Conan does not have a noble destiny; in contrast to much fantasy fiction, he is not of noble birth, he is not fulfilling any prophecy, he is not the "chosen one" of any gods or powers that be.  When Conan ultimately becomes King of Aquilonia, he is not preordained to do so by fate nor is he the legitimate heir; he seizes an opportunity to make himself king.  Conan is "the consummate self-determining man."

In The Shadow Kingdom, another character, Kull, gives thought to his essential nature:

Irrationalism and aestheticism 

Irrationalism and aestheticism were themes in Howard's work.  His philosophies were in line with the Romantic and Neo-Romantic eras.  While he held many philosophical positions in his life, they all shared a rebellion against reason, against tradition, and against tyranny in any from.

Howard's poetry was traditional and Romantic in form; which was against the trend of poetic tastes during his lifetime.  He was a "romantic isolate" sustaining the English romantic verse tradition in an "aesthetic 'Underground'" of poets such as Bliss Carman, George Sterling, Madison Cawein and other individuals scattered across North America.

The concept of beauty is expressed through Howard's fiction and verse in his love of colour and pageantry, from battlefields to decadent cities.  Wanderlust is a minor theme in a lot of his works but, despite travelling widely around Texas and nearby states, he did not travel as much as he wished.  Instead he romanticised these places he wanted to visit.  This plays back into the Romantic concept of Beauty.  The inspiration for this may have come from Howard's mother, Esther.  In a 1944 letter to E. Hoffmann Price, Howard's father, Dr. Isaac M. Howard, recalled that "she was a lover of the beautiful. As Robert grew, he saw the beautiful around the old country of the post oaks. His agile imagination transformed that drab old country into beautiful landscapes."

Aestheticism is addressed in the story "Queen of the Black Coast" when Conan expresses his personal philosophy of life:

This echoes the Rubaiyat of Omar Khayyam, which was one of Howard's favourite works of poetry (describing it as one of the most powerful pieces of literature), and one of its most famous quatrains: 

Howard's unique addition to Khayyám's vision of paradise is "the mad exultation of battle", or violent action as an ideal equal to food, drink and romantic company (see Hate and violence).

Scepticism regarding human rationality and achievement is clear in a letter Howard wrote to his friend Tevis Clyde Smith on August 28, 1925: "There is so much of the true and false in all things. Sometimes I believe that the whole is a monstrous joke and human accomplishment and human knowledge, gathered slowly and with incredible labor through the ages, are but shifting, drifting wraiths on the sands of Time, the sands that shall some day devour me."

Howard borrowed many feature of his fiction from the decadent movement, such as black magic, accursed jewels, snake figures and more.

The Irish 
Some of Howard's heroes are usually Irish and Howard himself was proud of his Irish heritage.

Past lives 
One of his favorite themes was that of past lives and reincarnation.

Sex appeal 
Howard's later fiction often includes a damsel in distress (usually with minimal clothing) to add sex appeal to the story.  This addition was likely an effort to earn the stories the honor of being illustrated on the publishing magazine's cover.  A story with a cover illustration would normally earn an extra payment on top of the initial sale.

References

Sources 

 
 
 
 
 
 
 
 
 
 
 
 

 
 
  Originally from Etchings in Ivory (1968).
 
 

Styles and themes
Themes of writers' works